A party motivator is a person paid to entertain attendants at a party. Typically, party motivators are attractive young men and women who dress fashionably and attempt to engage guests in socializing and dancing. Hiring party motivators is primarily a phenomenon within the American upper middle and upper classes; they are especially common at bar mitzvahs.

See also
Bargirl

External links
'Party Motivator' Ensures Good Fun, National Public Radio, November 3, 2003.
The secret of a successful Bar Mitzvah, Baltimore Jewish Times, July 18, 2003.
Bar Mitzvah Motivators, Aish HaTorah, June 15, 2003
What's a party without 'eye candy'?, USA Today, September 20, 2004.

Entertainment